Fusigobius pallidus, commonly called pale sandgoby, is a species of marine fish in the family Gobiidae.

The pale sandgoby is widespread throughout the tropical waters of the Indo-West Pacific from the eastern coast of Africa to the Philippines.

This sandgoby is a small sized fish, it can grow up to a size of  length.

References

Fish described in 2001
pallidus